Adelheid Arndt (born 3 January 1952, in Heidelberg) is a German actress.

Life
The daughter of a chemist and a teacher after graduation, she first studied ethnology in Berlin and graduated there from 1973 to 1977 from acting school.

She started her acting career at the Grips-Theater 1976 and received a role in the film , set in Prague during the period between 1936 and 1946. For her leading role in the film 1+1=3 [de] (1979), in which she represented a pregnant woman between two men, she received a German Film Award, the Ernst Lubitsch Award and a Grand Prix at IFF Montreal.

The versatile actress appeared in the 80s in several television films and series, and  collaborated actively in the ZDF Children's Series Quadriga, for which she earned a prize from the European Union.

In the 90s they turned next to their work in television again especially the theater.

Adelheid Arndt has a daughter named Johanna (1984).

Filmography
1977: 
1977: Tagebuch des Verführers (TV film)
1978: Ein unruhiges Jahr (TV film)
1978: Martha und Laura auf See (TV film)
1979: Der Landvogt von Greifensee
1979: 1+1=3 [de]
1979: Flugversuche (TV film)
1980: Kannst du zaubern, Opa? (TV play)
1981: Geld oder Leben (TV film)
1982: Ein Fall für zwei: Partner (TV)
1983: Melzer (TV film)
1984: Wanda (TV film)
1984: Chinese Boxes
1984: L.A.U.R.A.
1984: Drei Damen vom Grill (TV series, 3 episodes)
1985: Die Praxis der Liebe
1985: Geteiltes Land (short film)
1986: Rosa Luxemburg
1986: Wiedergefundene Zeit (TV film)
1986: Der Prinz (TV film)
1987: Smaragd (TV film)
1987: Herz mit Löffel
1988: Peter Strohm: Reihe 7, Grab 4 (TV)
1988–2003: Siebenstein (TV series)
1989: Ein Fall für zwei: Tod im Schlafsack (TV)
1989: Der blaue Mond
1989:  (TV film)
1990: Ein Fall für zwei: Schwarze Schafe (TV)
1992: Die Heiratsschwindlerin (TV film)
1993–1994: Family Passions (TV series)
1993: Eurocops: Alte Freunde (TV)
1994: Border Crossing (TV film)
1994: Wolffs Revier: Gesühnt (TV)
1999: Federmann (TV film)

Awards
German Film Awards: Film Ribbon in Gold (actress) for "1 + 1 = 3"
Ernst Lubitsch - Prize for 1 + 1 = 3 "
Grand Prix de Montreal for "1 + 1 = 3"
Federal Awards for "The girl war," "Divided country" and "Rosa Luxembourg"
"Prix Niki" (prize of the EU) "Quadriga"
"Golden Sparrow" (German Youth Television) for "Quadriga", 1997

External links
 

German film actresses
Living people
1952 births
Actors from Heidelberg
German television actresses
20th-century German actresses
Best Actress German Film Award winners